Kim Jin-ho is a Korean name consisting of the family name Kim and the given name Jin-ho, and may also refer to:

 Kim Jin-ho (archer) (born 1961), South Korean archer
 Kim Jin-ho (singer) (born 1986), South Korean singer